Teleiodes orientalis is a moth of the family Gelechiidae. It is found in Korea and Japan.

The wingspan is about 14 mm. The forewings are creamy white, suffused with dark fuscous scales. The basal patch is dark fuscous, often divided by pale brown scales. The antemedian fascia is dark fuscous, with the outer edge darker and with some white or orange scales. The costal patch is triangular, elongated along the costa and there is a central bright yellow patch, the lower edge mixed with dark grey scales. The hindwings are grey.

References

Moths described in 1992
Teleiodes